Jazz à la Bohemia (also released as Greenwich Village Jazz) is a live album by American jazz pianist Randy Weston's trio with saxophonist Cecil Payne which was recorded in 1956 at the Café Bohemia in Greenwich Village and released on the Riverside label.

Reception

Allmusic awarded the album 4½ stars, stating: "Randy Weston, who was more under Thelonious Monk's influence back in 1956 then he would be in the near future, is in top form during this live set".

Track listing 

 "Theme: Solemn Meditation" (Sam Gill) - 0:45  
 "Just a Riff" (Sid Catlett) - 9:50  
 "You Go to My Head" (J. Fred Coots, Haven Gillespie) - 6:10  
 "Once in a While" (Michael Edwards, Bud Green) - 6:26  
 "Hold 'Em Joe" (Traditional) - 7:24  
 "It's All Right with Me" (Cole Porter) - 3:48  
 "Chessman's Delight" - 9:26  (Randy Weston)
 "Theme: Solemn Meditation" (Gill) - 1:24

Personnel
Randy Weston - piano (trio track 3/solo track 6)
Cecil Payne - baritone saxophone 
Ahmed Abdul-Malik - bass
Al Dreares - drums

References 

Randy Weston live albums
1956 live albums
Riverside Records live albums
Albums produced by Orrin Keepnews
Albums recorded at the Café Bohemia